Herman Wouk (May 27, 1915 – May 17, 2019) was an American author best known for historical fiction such as The Caine Mutiny (1951) for which he won the Pulitzer Prize in fiction.

His other major works include The Winds of War and War and Remembrance, historical novels about World War II, and non-fiction such as This Is My God, an explanation of Judaism from a Modern Orthodox perspective, written for Jewish and non-Jewish audiences. His books have been translated into 27 languages.

The Washington Post called Wouk, who cherished his privacy, "the reclusive dean of American historical novelists". Historians, novelists, publishers, and critics who gathered at the Library of Congress in 1995 to mark Wouk's 80th birthday described him as an American Tolstoy.

Early life
Wouk was born in the Bronx, the second of three children born to Esther (née Levine) and Abraham Isaac Wouk, Russian Jewish immigrants from what is today Belarus. His father toiled for many years to raise the family out of poverty before opening a successful laundry service.

When Wouk was 13, his maternal grandfather, Mendel Leib Levine, came from Minsk to live with them and took charge of his grandson's Jewish education. Wouk was frustrated by the amount of time he was expected to study the Talmud, but his father told him, "if I were on my deathbed, and I had breath to say one more thing to you, I would say 'Study the Talmud.'" Eventually Wouk took this advice to heart. After a brief period as a young adult during which he lived a secular life, he returned to religious practice. Judaism would become integral to both his personal life and his career. He would later say that his grandfather and the United States Navy were the two most important influences on his life.

After his childhood and adolescence in the Bronx, he graduated from the original Townsend Harris High School in Manhattan, Townsend Harris Hall Prep School, which was the elite prep school for City College. He earned a Bachelor of Arts degree at the age of 19 from Columbia University in 1934, where he was a member of the Pi Lambda Phi fraternity. He also served as editor of the university's humor magazine, Jester, and wrote two of its annual Varsity Shows. Soon thereafter, he became a radio dramatist, working in David Freedman's "Joke Factory" and later with Fred Allen for five years and then, in 1941, for the United States government, writing radio spots to sell war bonds.

Career

Military career
Following the attack on Pearl Harbor, Wouk joined the U.S. Naval Reserve in 1942 and served in the Pacific Theater during World War II, an experience he later characterized as educational: "I learned about machinery, I learned how men behaved under pressure, and I learned about Americans." Wouk served as an officer aboard two destroyer minesweepers (DMS), the USS Zane and USS Southard, becoming executive officer of the latter while holding the rank of lieutenant. He participated in around six invasions and won a number of battle stars. Wouk was in the New Georgia Campaign, the Gilbert and Marshall Islands campaign, the Mariana and Palau Islands campaign, and the Battle of Okinawa. During off-duty hours aboard ship he started writing a novel, Aurora Dawn, which he originally titled Aurora Dawn; or, The True history of Andrew Reale, containing a faithful account of the Great Riot, together with the complete texts of Michael Wilde's oration and Father Stanfield's sermon. Wouk sent a copy of the opening chapters to philosophy professor Irwin Edman, under whom he studied at Columbia, who quoted a few pages verbatim to a New York editor. The result was a publisher's contract sent to Wouk's ship, then off the coast of Okinawa. Aurora Dawn was published in 1947 and became a Book of the Month Club main selection. Wouk finished his tour of duty in 1946.

Writing career
His second novel, City Boy, proved to be a commercial disappointment at the time of its initial publication in 1948; Wouk once claimed it was largely ignored amid the excitement over Norman Mailer's bestselling World War II novel The Naked and the Dead.

While writing his next novel, Wouk read each chapter to his wife as it was completed. At one point she remarked that if they did not like this one, he had better take up another line of work (a line he would give to the character of the editor Jeannie Fry in his novel Youngblood Hawke, 1962). The novel, The Caine Mutiny (1951), went on to win the Pulitzer Prize for Fiction. A best-seller, drawing from his wartime experiences aboard minesweepers during World War II, The Caine Mutiny was adapted by the author into a Broadway play called The Caine Mutiny Court-Martial and, in 1954, Columbia Pictures released a film version with Humphrey Bogart portraying Lt. Commander Philip Francis Queeg, captain of the fictional USS Caine.

His first novel after The Caine Mutiny was Marjorie Morningstar (1955), which earned him a Time magazine cover story. Three years later Warner Bros. made it into a movie starring Natalie Wood, Gene Kelly and Claire Trevor. His next novel, a paperback, was Slattery's Hurricane (1956), which he had written in 1948 as the basis for the screenplay for the film of the same name. Wouk's first work of non-fiction was 1959's This is My God: The Jewish Way of Life.

In the 1960s, he authored Youngblood Hawke (1962), a drama about the rise and fall of a young writer modeled on the life of Thomas Wolfe, and Don't Stop the Carnival (1965), a comedy about escaping mid-life crisis by moving to the Caribbean (loosely based on Wouk's own experience). Youngblood Hawke was serialized in McCall's magazine from March to July 1962. A movie version starred James Franciscus and Suzanne Pleshette and was released by Warner Brothers in 1964. Don't Stop the Carnival was turned into a short-lived musical by Jimmy Buffett in 1997.

In the 1970s, Wouk published two monumental novels, The Winds of War (1971) and its sequel, War and Remembrance (1978). He described the latter, which included a devastating depiction of the Holocaust, as "the main tale I have to tell." Both were made into successful television miniseries, the first in 1983 and the second in 1988. Although they were made several years apart, both were directed by Dan Curtis and both starred Robert Mitchum as Captain Victor "Pug" Henry, the main character. The novels are historical fiction. Each has three layers: the story told from the viewpoints of Captain Henry and his circle of family and friends, a more or less straightforward historical account of the events of the war, and an analysis by a member of Adolf Hitler's military staff, the insightful fictional General Armin von Roon. Wouk devoted "thirteen years of extraordinary research and long, arduous composition" to these two novels, noted Arnold Beichman. "The seriousness with which Wouk has dealt with the war can be seen in the prodigious amount of research, reading, travel and conferring with experts, the evidence of which may be found in the uncatalogued boxes at Columbia University" that contain the author's papers.

Inside, Outside (1985) is the story of four generations of a Russian Jewish family and its travails in Russia, the U.S. and Israel. The Hope (1993) and its sequel, The Glory (1994), are historical novels about the first 33 years of Israel's history. They were followed by The Will to Live On: This is Our Heritage (2000), a whirlwind tour of Jewish history and sacred texts and companion volume to This is My God.

In 1995, Wouk was honored on his 80th birthday by the Library of Congress with a symposium on his career. In attendance were David McCullough, Robert Caro, and Daniel Boorstin, among others.

A Hole in Texas (2004) is a novel about the discovery of the Higgs boson, whose existence was proven nine years later, while The Language God Talks: On Science and Religion (2010) is an exploration into the tension between religion and science that originated in a discussion Wouk had with the theoretical physicist Richard Feynman.

The Lawgiver (2012) is an epistolary novel about a contemporary Hollywood writer of a movie script about Moses, with the consulting help of a nonfictional character, Herman Wouk, a "mulish ancient" who gets involved despite the strong misgivings of his wife.

Wouk's memoir, titled Sailor and Fiddler: Reflections of a 100-Year-Old Author, was published in January 2016 to mark his 100th birthday. NPR called it "a lovely coda to the career of a man who made American literature a kinder, smarter, better place." It was his last book.

Daily journal
Wouk kept a personal diary from 1937. On September 10, 2008, Wouk presented the Library of Congress with his journals, which number more than 100 volumes , at a ceremony that honored him with the first Library of Congress Lifetime Achievement Award for the Writing of Fiction (now the Library of Congress Prize for American Fiction). Wouk often referred to his journals to check dates and facts in his writing, and he was hesitant to let the originals out of his personal possession. A solution was negotiated: a scanning service bureau was selected to scan the entire set of volumes into digital formats.

Personal life and death
In late 1944 Wouk met Betty Sarah Brown, a Phi Beta Kappa graduate of the University of Southern California, who was working as a personnel specialist in the navy while the Zane was undergoing repairs in San Pedro, California. The two quickly fell in love and after his ship went back to sea, Betty, who was born a Protestant and was raised in Grangeville, Idaho, began her study of Judaism and converted on her twenty-fifth birthday. They were married on December 10, 1945.

With the birth of the first of their three children the next year, Wouk became a full-time writer to support his growing family. His first-born son, Abraham Isaac Wouk, was named after Wouk's late father. He drowned in a swimming pool accident in Cuernavaca, Mexico shortly before his fifth birthday. Wouk later dedicated War and Remembrance to him with the Biblical words "בלע המות לנצח – He will destroy death forever" (Isaiah 25:8). Their second and third children were Iolanthe Woulff (born 1950 as Nathaniel Wouk, a Princeton University graduate and an author) and Joseph (born 1954, a Columbia graduate, an attorney, a film producer, and a writer who served in the Israeli Navy). He had three grandchildren.

The Wouks lived in New York, Saint Thomas, U.S. Virgin Islands (where he wrote Don't Stop the Carnival) and at 3255 N Street N.W. in the Georgetown section of Washington, D.C. (where he researched and wrote The Winds of War and War and Remembrance) before settling in Palm Springs, California. His wife, who served for decades as his literary agent, died in that city on March 17, 2011.

"I wrote nothing that was of the slightest consequence before I met Sarah," Wouk recalled after her death. "I was a gag man for Fred Allen for five years. In his time, he was the greatest of the radio comedians. And jokes work for what they are but they're ephemeral. They just disappear. And that was the kind of thing I did up until the time that I met Sarah and we married. And I would say my literary career and my mature life both began with her."

His brother Victor died in 2005. His nephew, Alan I. Green, was a psychiatrist at Dartmouth College.

Wouk died in his sleep in his home in Palm Springs, California, on May 17, 2019, at the age of 103, ten days before his 104th birthday.

Degrees
 Columbia University, New York, 1934 (A.B. with general honors)
 Yeshiva University, New York, 1954 (Hon. L.H.D.)
 Clark University, Worcester, Massachusetts, 1960 (Hon. D.Lit.)
 American International College, Springfield, Massachusetts, 1979 (Hon. Litt.D.)
 Bar-Ilan University, Ramat Gan, Israel, 1990 (Hon. Ph.D.)

Awards and honors
 Pulitzer Prize for Fiction, 1952
 Columbia University Medal for Excellence, 1952
 Alexander Hamilton Medal, 1980

 Golden Plate Award, American Academy of Achievement, 1986
 United States Navy Memorial Foundation Lone Sailor Award, 1987
 Bar-Ilan University Guardian of Zion Award, 1998

 Jewish Book Council Lifetime Literary Achievement Award, 1999
 Library of Congress Lifetime Achievement Award for the Writing of Fiction (inaugural), 2008

Published works

 The Man in the Trench Coat (1941, play)
 Aurora Dawn (1947)
 City Boy: The Adventures of Herbie Bookbinder (1948)
 The Traitor (1949 play)
 The Caine Mutiny (1951)

 The Caine Mutiny Court-Martial (1953, play)
 Marjorie Morningstar (1955)
 Slattery's Hurricane (1956)
 The "Lomokome" Papers (written in 1949, published in 1956)
 Nature's Way (1957, play)
 This is My God: The Jewish Way of Life (1959, revised ed. 1973, revised ed. 1988, non-fiction)
 Youngblood Hawke (1962)
 Don't Stop the Carnival (1965)
 The Winds of War (1971)
 War and Remembrance (1978)
 Inside, Outside (1985)
 The Hope (1993)
 The Glory (1994)
 The Will to Live On: This is Our Heritage (2000, non-fiction)
 A Hole in Texas (2004)
 The Language God Talks: On Science and Religion (2010, non-fiction)
 The Lawgiver (2012)
 Sailor and Fiddler: Reflections of a 100-Year Old Author (2015, non-fiction)

See also
Herman Wouk Is Still Alive

References

Further reading
Barbara A. Paulson, ed., The Historical Novel: A Celebration of the Achievements of Herman Wouk (1999)
Arnold Beichman, Herman Wouk: The Novelist as Social Historian (1984)
Laurence W. Mazzeno, Herman Wouk (1994)

External links

"Books: The Wouk Mutiny", Time Magazine cover story, September 5, 1955
Columbia 250: Herman Wouk
Herman Wouk Papers

Profile , betweenthecovers.com
Interview, CBS News Sunday Morning

Herman Wouk at Find a Grave
 Finding aid to Herman Wouk papers at Columbia University. Rare Book & Manuscript Library.
 Finding aid to Nancy Dawson and Herman Wouk Collection, 1952-1965, at Columbia University. Rare Book & Manuscript Library.

1915 births
2019 deaths
Writers from the Bronx
Military personnel from New York City
United States Navy personnel of World War II
United States Navy officers
Jewish American military personnel
American Modern Orthodox Jews
American centenarians
American diarists
American people of Belarusian-Jewish descent
Baalei teshuva
Burials at Beth David Cemetery
Columbia College (New York) alumni
Columbia University alumni
Jewish American novelists
Pulitzer Prize for Fiction winners
Townsend Harris High School alumni
American male novelists
Novelists from New York (state)
American male non-fiction writers
People from Georgetown (Washington, D.C.)
American people of Russian-Jewish descent
20th-century American male writers
21st-century American male writers
20th-century American non-fiction writers
21st-century American non-fiction writers
Jews of World War II
United States Navy reservists
Men centenarians
21st-century American Jews